Emmett Craik (born 25 November 1974) is a New Zealand cricketer. He played in one first-class and three List A matches for Central Districts in 1999/00.

See also
 List of Central Districts representative cricketers

References

External links
 

1974 births
Living people
New Zealand cricketers
Central Districts cricketers
Cricketers from Hastings, New Zealand